Amiya Chakravarty (30 November 1912 – 6 March 1957) was an Indian film director, screenwriter and producer, who was leading film director in Hindi cinema of the 1940s and 1950s. He is noted for films like Daag (1952), Patita (1953), and Seema (1955) for which he won the 4th Filmfare Award for Best Story. Chakravarty is also credited along with Devika Rani for discovering Dilip Kumar, whom he gave his first break in 1944 film Jwar Bhata (1944 film).Chakravarty also produced and directed Daag (1952 film) in 1952 for which Dilip Kumar won his first ever Filmfare Award for Best Actor.

He was married to Saraswati Shastri a.k.a. Kamala, younger sister of Lakshmi Shankar (née Shastri) wife of Rajendra Shankar, elder brother of Sitar maestro, Ravi Shankar.

Filmography

References

External links
 
 

1912 births
1957 deaths
Hindi-language film directors
Indian male screenwriters
Hindi film producers
Filmfare Awards winners
20th-century Indian film directors
Bengali film directors
People from Bogra District
20th-century Indian screenwriters
20th-century Indian male writers